Marco d'Oggiono (c. 1470 – c. 1549) was an Italian Renaissance painter and a chief pupil of Leonardo da Vinci, many of whose works he copied.

Biography and works

He was born at Oggiono near Milan. Of the details of his life, we know almost nothing — not even the date of his important series of frescoes painted for the church of Santa Maria della Pace in Milan. He probably died in Milan. Luigi Lanzi gave 1530 as the date of his death, but various writers in Milan say it took place in 1540, and now the best accepted date is 1549.

 

He was a hard-working artist, but his work has since been criticized by some for paintings are wanting in vivacity of feeling and purity of drawing, while, in his composition, it has been well said that "intensity of color does duty for intensity of sentiment". He copied Leonardo's Last Supper repeatedly, and one of his best copies is in the possession of the Royal Academy of Arts. The Hungarian art critic Paul George Konody, in examining the Isleworth Mona Lisa, wrote of that painting:

His two most notable pictures — one in the Pinacoteca di Brera (representing St. Michael), and the other in the private gallery of the Bonomi family (representing the Madonna) — are signed with his name in Latin, "Marcus".
 
Other works by d'Oggiono can be seen at Berlin, Paris, St. Petersburg and Turin, the one in Russia being a clever copy of the Last Supper by Leonardo. The Catholic Encyclopedia said of d'Oggiono, "[h]e cannot be regarded as an important artist, or even a very good copyist, but in his pictures the sky and mountains and the distant landscapes are always worthy of consideration, and in these we probably get the painter's best original work".

References

Sources
 
Marco D'Oggione at New Advent
Leonardo da Vinci, Master Draftsman, exhibition catalog fully online as PDF from The Metropolitan Museum of Art, which contains material on Marco d'Oggiono (see index)

External links 

1470s births
1540s deaths
People from the Province of Milan
15th-century Italian painters
Italian male painters
16th-century Italian painters
Painters from Milan
Italian Renaissance painters
Catholic painters
Pupils and followers of Leonardo da Vinci